Raymond Rognoni (Paris, 16 August 1892 – Paris, 26 September 1965) was a French actor and comedian. He worked in the theatre and in film (Sylvie et le fantôme, Les Enfants du Paradis), sometimes credited as Rognoni.

Biography
Rognoni was born Roch Raymond Rognoni on 16 August 1892 in Paris. He worked for the Comédie-Française from 1922 to 1929.

He died 26 September 1965 in Paris. Rognoni was married to Jean Lorraine.

Selected filmography
 American Love (1931)
 The Fortune (1931)
 La chauve-souris (1931)
 L'Aventurier (1934)
 The House on the Dune (1934)
 Madame Angot's Daughter (1935)
 Claudine at School (1937)
 Personal Column (1939)
 Monsieur Hector (1940)
 Jud Süß (1940, voice only)
 The Island of Love (1944)
 Mademoiselle X (1945)
 Majestic Hotel Cellars (1945)
 Les Enfants du Paradis (1945)
 Father Goriot (1945)
 Sylvie and the Ghost (1946)
 My Seal and Them (1951)
 My Friend Oscar (1951)
 Le Plaisir (1952)
 Alone in the World (1952)
 The Agony of the Eagles (1952)
 Their Last Night (1953)

Notes and references

External links
 

1892 births
1965 deaths
Male actors from Paris
French male film actors
French male stage actors
20th-century French male actors